Portland Rosebuds may refer to:

 Portland Rosebuds (baseball), a Negro league baseball team in Portland, Oregon in 1946
 Portland Rosebuds (ice hockey), the name of two professional ice hockey teams in Portland, Oregon: one in 1914–1918 and one in 1925–1926